The 5th Grand Prix du Salon was a Formula One motor race held on 9 October 1949 at the Autodrome de Linas-Montlhéry, in Montlhéry near Paris, France.

The 64-lap race was won by Talbot-Lago driver Raymond Sommer, who also set fastest lap. Harry Schell and Pierre Meyrat, also in Talbot-Lagos, were second and third.

Results

References

Salon